TSS Galtee More was a twin screw passenger steamship operated by the London and North Western Railway from 1898 to 1923.

History
She was built by William Denny and Brothers of Dumbarton for the London and North Western Railway in 1898. She was named after Galtymore, the highest of the Galtee Mountains in Ireland. She was put in service between Holyhead and Greenore.

On 17 September 1909 she was approaching Carlingford Lough when, in dense fog and at low tide, she went aground near Houlbowline light. The company’s lough steamer, Greenore, was promptly in attendance and the Galtee More shortly afterwards floated off.

References

1898 ships
Ships built on the River Clyde
Passenger ships of the United Kingdom
Ships of the London and North Western Railway
Steamships